William James Firey (1923–2004) was an American mathematician, specializing in the geometry of convex bodies.

Born in Montana, Firey moved with his family to Seattle when he was 6 years old. During World War II, he served in the U.S. Army as a medical technician in Europe. He married in 1946. During the first years of their marriage, the couple worked for the United States Forest Service during summers in fire look-out stations in the Washington Cascades.

Firey received in 1948 his bachelor's degree from the University of Washington, in 1949 his master's degree from the University of Toronto, and in 1954 his Ph.D. from Stanford University. He was a faculty member at Washington State University for 8 years and then became a professor at Oregon State University, where he retired as professor emeritus in 1988. He was a visiting professor at several universities and made several trips to the Mathematical Research Institute of Oberwolfach.

In 1974 Firey was an Invited Speaker at the International Congress of Mathematicians in Vancouver.

Upon his death he was survived by his widow and his daughter and predeceased by his son.

Selected publications

References

1923 births
2004 deaths
20th-century American mathematicians
21st-century American mathematicians
Geometers
University of Washington alumni
University of Toronto alumni
Stanford University alumni
Washington State University faculty
Oregon State University faculty
People from Roundup, Montana